The Britbowl is the championship game of the British American Football National League, and formerly the British American Football League (BAFL) in the United Kingdom. It is the most prestigious of the league's three bowl games that constitute Britbowl Weekend. Only teams in the Premier Division of BAFL are eligible to compete in Britbowl. To progress to a Britbowl the winner of the seasonal BAFA Premier Division South will play the Runner up of the Premier North and vice versa in a semi-finals with the two winners eventually meeting in a final. Teams who play in the second and third levels compete for promotion in their own Championship Bowl games

To mark its 20th anniversary, Roman numerals were introduced to identify the game. The 2006 Championship became known as Britbowl XX. The previous nineteen bowl games were redesignated as Britbowl I to Britbowl XIX respectively.

Since Britbowl XX the winning team has been presented with the Boston Trophy. The current champions are the Manchester Titans, who defeated the London Warriors 37–7 in Britbowl XXXIV on 3 September 2022.

National League - Championship Games

Sources: BAFRA All-Time Bowl Crews List / britbowlnow.co.uk results lists

Other Senior Bowl Games

Sources: BAFRA All-Time Bowl Crews List / britbowlnow.co.uk results lists

BritBowl Championships

Lower Division Championships

 Note:
 There were no lower divisions prior to 1989

BritBowl appearances 

The following teams have 1 win from 1 appearance:
Bournemouth Buccaneers, Leicester Panthers, London Capitals, Norwich Devils, Redbridge Fire, Woking Generals, Tamworth Phoenix

The following teams have 1 loss from 1 appearance:
Bedford Bombardiers, Leicester Huntsmen, Milton Keynes Pioneers, Nottingham Caesars, Sussex Thunder

Lower Division Championship Appearances

The following teams have 1 win from 1 appearance:
Barnsley Bears, Chester Romans, Doncaster Mustangs, Gateshead Senators, Glasgow Cyclones, Kingston Thames Pirates, Lincoln Saints, Merseyside Centurians, Milton Keynes Pioneers, Oxford Saints, Rugby Rollers, South Wales Warriors, Winchester Rifles

The following teams have 1 loss from 1 appearance:
ASAP Yorkshire Rams, Barracudas, Basildon Chiefs, Bath Gladiators, Bedford Bombardiers, Birmingham Bulls, Croydon Kings, Cumbria Cougars, Dundee Hurricanes, Gwent Mustangs, Kent Exiles, Lancashire Wolverines, Nottingham Caesars, Redbridge Fire, Sutton Coalfield Royals, Tiger Bay Warriors, Trent Valley Warriors

See also
British American Football League
Boston Trophy

American football in the United Kingdom
American football trophies and awards
American football bowls in Europe
1987 establishments in the United Kingdom
Recurring sporting events established in 1987
British American Football League